Jingcheng may refer to:
Xu Jingcheng (許景澄) (1845–1900), Qing Dynasty diplomat
Jingcheng (竟成), a pseudonym of educator Kong Zhaoshou
Jingcheng, a name for Beijing's inner city
Jingcheng, Nanjing County, Zhangzhou (靖城镇), a town in Nanjing County, Zhangzhou, Fujian Province, China
Jingcheng, Changjiang, Jingdezhen (竟成镇), a town in Jiangxi Province, China
Jingcheng Railway (京承铁路; Jīngchéng Tiělù), commonly called Beijing–Chengde Railway
Jingcheng Expressway, the former name of the part of the G45 Daqing–Guangzhou Expressway north of Beijing 
Jīngchéng, an alternate Romanization of Chang'an, an ancient Chinese city

See also
Jincheng,  prefecture-level city in Shanxi, China
Jincheng 1 UAV (金诚), an unmanned helicopter